Nicola Guillermo Ferrara (born August 28, 1910 in Chiaromonte, Italy) was an Argentine professional football player. He also held Italian citizenship.

His younger brother Antonio Ferrara also played football professionally (including 3 seasons in the Serie A on the same teams as Nicola). To distinguish them, Nicola was known as Ferrara I and Antonio as Ferrara II.

Honours
 Serie A champion: 1937/38.

1910 births
Year of death missing
Argentine footballers
Club Atlético Platense footballers
Serie A players
U.S. Livorno 1915 players
S.S.C. Napoli players
Inter Milan players
Association football midfielders